Centrodinium is  genus of dinoflagellates in the order Gonyaulacales.

Species 
 Centrodinium biconicum (Murray & Whitting) F.J.R.Taylor
 Centrodinium complanatum (Cleve) Kofoid
 Centrodinium deflexoides Balech
 Centrodinium deflexum Kofoid
 Centrodinium elongatum Kofoid
 Centrodinium eminens Bohm
 Centrodinium expansum Kofoid & Michener
 Centrodinium intermedium Pavillard
 Centrodinium maximum Pavillard
 Centrodinium michaelsarsii (Gaarder) F.J.R.Taylor
 Centrodinium mimeticum (Balech) F.J.R.Taylor
 Centrodinium ovalis (Pavillard) Hernández-Becerril
 Centrodinium pacificum (Rampi) F.J.R.Taylor
 Centrodinium pavillardii F.J.R.Taylor
 Centrodinium porulosum Kofoid & Michener
 Centrodinium pulchrum Bohm
 Centrodinium punctatum (Cleve) F.J.R.Taylor

 Names brought to synonymy
 Centrodinium elegans (Pavillard) F.J.R.Taylor accepted as Oxytoxum elegans Pavillard
 Centrodinium frenguellii (Rampi) F.J.R.Taylor accepted as Oxytoxum elegans Pavillard
 Centrodinium globosum (Kofoid) F.J.R.Taylor accepted as Heterodinium globosum Kofoid
 Centrodinium latum (Gaarder) F.J.R.Taylor accepted as Oxytoxum reticulatum (Stein) Schütt
 Centrodinium reticulatum (Stein) Loeblich Jr. & Loeblich III accepted as Oxytoxum reticulatum (Stein) Schütt
 Centrodinium tesselatum (Stein) Loeblich Jr. & Loeblich III accepted as Oxytoxum tesselatum (Stein) F.Schütt

References 

Algae genera
Dinoflagellate genera
Gonyaulacales